The Fresh International Film Festival is a festival for young people which takes place in Limerick, Ireland each Spring.

Running since 1997, Fresh Film is a year round organisation. The annual festival includes its competitive event,  Ireland's Young Filmmaker of the Year, which screens films made by young people aged between 7 and 18 years.

Festival
The Festival's main aim is to encourage young people to make films. The festival screens a number of feature films and hosts workshops, masterclasses and meetings for young filmmakers.

Jury
Ireland's Young Filmmaker of the Year is judged by a number of film and education professionals and the 1st and 2nd prize winners at the previous years competition.

Winners

Best Short Film
2020: Senior Award "Pirates"- Directed by Cal O'Driscoll (director)
2019: Senior Award "Rue"- Directed by Sean Treacy (director)
2018: Senior Award "Choice" - Directed by John Farrelly (director)
2017: Senior Award "Hidden Potential" - Directed by Eamonn McMahon
2016: Senior Award "Poppies" - Directed by Rachel McGill, Limerick Ireland
2011: Senior Award "4:27 AM" -Directed by Seán Murphy
2010: Senior Award "Dystopia" by Seán Conroy from Dublin, Ireland
2009: Senior Award "The Grim Trials of Vida Novac" by Nicholas Sheridan from Wexford, Ireland
2008: Senior Award "Alien Verbatim" by Laurence Snashall from Schull, Ireland
2007: Senior Award "Hang Up Noise Man" by Re Productions from Dublin, Ireland
2006: Senior Award "The Cycle" dir. Eoghan McQuinn from Dublin, Ireland
2005: Senior Award "The Vent" dir. Glenn Lambert DublinMade Films,  Dublin, Ireland
2004: Senior Award " The Boy's Revenge" dir. Jonathan Lambert, DublinMade Films, Dublin, Ireland
2003: Senior Award "The Unmentionable" dir. Dónal Foreman & Danny McMahon, DogDay Films, Dublin, Ireland
2002: Senior Award "Weird Evolution" dir. Emlyn Lewis, Cavan
2001: Senior Award "Oxygen" by Jeremy O'Hanlon, Dublin, Ireland
2000: Senior Award "After The War" by Vincent Lambe, Dublin, Ireland
1999: Senior Award "The Jock Club and the Mellon Collie Death of Eugene Nerdlinger" dir. Anthony Kinsella - C13 Pictures

Radharc Trust: Documentary Award
This category is sponsored by the Radharc Trust
 "The First Rose" -5th Class Scoil Eoin
 "Sneakers" dir. Patrickswell National School, Limerick, Ireland
 "Abuelita" dir. Santana Hernandez Power, Kilkenny, Ireland
 "The Fool's Card" Sian Murray, Dublin, Ireland

Brown Bag Animation Award
The animation award is supported by Brown Bag Films
 "Ages Ago" -Ryan and Mark Buckley
 "The Show-Offs"  by Colaiste Chiarain, Croom, Limeric
 "Reflection"  by Alfie Hollingsworth and Dylan Bickerton
 "UpsideDown Goldfish" dir Bryan O'Sullivan, Cork, Ireland
 "The Last Penguin"  by Sacred Heart School, Portlaoise, Ireland

RTÉ 60 second short award
The "short" award is presented in conjunction with RTÉ
 "Piece Of Cake" Laura Gaynor, Sligo, Ireland
 "The Show-Offs" by Colaiste Chiarain, Croom, Limerick

International Award
 "Girls" aka 'Piger' by Ida Gedbierg Soerensen/Stammen, Station Next, Denmark

Workshops 
Workshops have included a videogame design workshop and a filmmaking workshop by Eugene O'Connor.

Screenings 
The animated feature film Persepolis was screened on the 28th.

A collection of international short films made by young people from across Europe, Palestine and South Korea was screened under the title "Kids on the Move".

Award ceremony
The award ceremony for the senior category is held in March/April.

Trivia
2nd Prize winner for 'Requiem' in 2007, director Patrick Ryan made his 'Irish western' 'Darkness On The Edge Of Town' in 2014 Darkness on the Edge of Town (2013).
1st Prize winner in 2003 for 'The Unmentionable', Dónal Foreman has written, directed and edited three feature films: Out Of Here(2013), The Image You Missed (2018) and The Cry of Granuaile (2022).
2nd prize winning director in 1998, Conor McMahon released his feature film Stiches starring British comedian Ross Noble (2012). He is currently in pre-production on a feature film shooting in summer 2019.

References

External links
Fresh Film Festival: Official Website

Film festivals in Ireland